George "Gee" Mitchell (March 15, 1912 – October 27, 1984) was an American football and boxing coach and college athletic administrator. He served as the head football coach at the Southwestern Louisiana Institute of Liberal and Technical Learning (now known as the University of Louisiana at Lafayette) from 1947 to 1949, compiling a record of 18–8–1.

A native of Rayville, Louisiana, Mitchell was a letterman while playing guard for LSU during their 1932 and 1933 seasons. Mitchell was hired at Southwestern Louisiana in 1935 to serve as both head boxing coach and as line coach on the football team. After leaving the program to serve in the Army during World War II from 1943 to 1945, Mitchell returned to Southwestern as athletic director in 1946 and then as head football coach from 1947 to 1949. In 1950, Mitchell accepted a position at then Francis T. Nicholls Junior College (now known as Nicholls State University) to establish its athletics program. He remained at Nicholls through 1973 when he retired as a full professor.

Head coaching record

College football

References

External links
 

1912 births
1984 deaths
American football guards
Louisiana Ragin' Cajuns athletic directors
Louisiana Ragin' Cajuns football coaches
LSU Tigers football players
People from Richland Parish, Louisiana
Coaches of American football from Louisiana
Players of American football from Louisiana